Libellus de principiis Ordinis Praedicatorum or simply  ) is a work written by Jordan of Saxony on Saint Dominic and the beginnings of the Dominican Order of Preachers. It was written around 1233.

Editions

See also
Acta Sanctorum

External links

References

13th-century Christian texts
1234 works
Dominican Order
Medieval Latin literature